San Salvador de Jujuy is capital of the Argentine Jujuy province.

Jujuy may also refer to:

 Jujuy Province in Argentina
 Jujuy language, an extinct indigenous language of Argentina
 Jujuy (Buenos Aires Underground), a metro station